Eros is the first greatest hits album by Italian pop/rock singer Eros Ramazzotti, released in 1997 on the BMG label.  Of the album's 16 tracks, five are original recordings, nine re-recordings and two new tracks.  Two of the re-recorded tracks are duets; "Musica è" featuring Andrea Bocelli and "Cose della vita (Can't Stop Thinking of You)" with Tina Turner.  Eros topped the albums chart in six countries.

Track listing 
Original recordings - Tracks 7, 10, 12, 14, 15
Re-recordings - Tracks 1-6, 8, 9, 13
New recordings - Tracks 11, 16
Tracks written by Eros Ramazzotti, Piero Cassano, Adelio Cogliati unless stated
 "Terra promessa" (Ramazzotti, Brioschi, Salerno) - 4:38
 "Una storia importante" - 4:05
 "Adesso tu" - 4:02
 "Ma che bello questo amore" - 4:12
 "Musica è" - 9:46 (Duet with Andrea Bocelli)
 "Occhi di speranza" - 3:19
 "Più bella cosa" - 4:24
 "Memorie" - 3:31
 "Cose della vita (Can't Stop Thinking of You)" (Ramazzotti, Cassano, Cogliati, Ralston, Turner) - 4:48  (Duet with Tina Turner)
 "L'aurora" - 5:32
 "Ancora un minuto di sole" (Ramazzotti, Cassano, Cogliati, Fabrizio) - 3:56
 "Quasi amore" - 5:08
 "Se bastasse una canzone" - 5:22
 "Un'altra te" - 4:40
 "Favola" - 4:23
 "Quanto amore sei" (Ramazzotti, Cogliati, Guidetti) - 4:16

Charts

Weekly charts

Year-end charts

Sales and certifications

References

Eros Ramazzotti compilation albums
Italian-language compilation albums
1997 greatest hits albums
Sony Music Italy compilation albums